The Empress of the Dynasty is a Taiwanese television series based on the life of Wu Zetian, the only female emperor in Chinese history. Directed by Li Yueh-fung and produced by Lin Hui-chun, the series starred Angela Pan as Wu Zetian. It was first broadcast in Taiwan on CTV from 18 November 1985 to 10 January 1986.

Plot
Wu Shiyue was surprised when his wife Lady Yang gave birth to a daughter. His daughter was foretold to be important in the future. His daughter, Wu Meiniang entered the palace at the age of fourteen to serve as a concubine to Emperor Taizong of Tang. He acknowledges these talents and favors her after the death of Empress Zhangsun. She instead develops feelings for his son Li Zhi. She helped him gain prominence over his brothers Li Tai and Li Chengqian.

After the Crown Prince is deposed, Meiniang helped Li Zhi become the Crown Prince, and eventually emperor. 
He rescued her from a convent, and she is taken back to the palace after Emperor Taizong dies. She faces enemies such as Empress Wang and Consort Xiao, and several of Li Zhi's officials. After the downfall of Consort Xiao and Empress Wang, Meiniang ascends as Empress Wu. Her life isn't easy, because her sister the Lady of Han has an affair with Li Zhi and she is despised by Zhangsun Wuji. Since Li Zhi is often ill, Meiniang is in charge of politics.

Cast
 Angela Pan as Wu Zetian / Princess Taiping (young)
 Liang Hsiu-shen as Emperor Taizong
 Fan Jih-hsing as Emperor Gaozong
 Ke Wei-chia as Li Xian
 Hua Shao-chiang as Li Dan
 Kao Pei-chun as Li Hong
 Hou Kuan-chun as Li Xian
 You Kuo-tung as Li Chengqian
 Ting Hua-chung as Li Tai
 Liu Lin as Li Yuanchang
 Tsui Hao-jan as Ming Xuewen
 Hsu Chia-jung as Cheng Nanying
 Chen Pei-ling as Empress Wang
 Liu Hsiao-ping as Lady of Han
 Pan Chin-hao as Helan Minzhi
 Kung Lien-hua as Consort Xiao
 Sihung Lung as Zhangsun Wuji
 Lin Hsiu-chun as Empress Zhangsun
 Chang Pi as Xiaoshunzi
 Chou Chung-lien as Shangguan Yi
 Pei Hsin-yu as Shangguan Wan'er
 Kuan Yi as Madam Liu
 Li Yih-min as Zhikong (Feng Xiaobao)
 Wang Jui as Chu Suiliang
 Tieh Meng-chiu as Wang Renyou
 Kao Chen-peng as Yuan Tiangang
 Nan Chun as Li Chunfeng
 Wu Fung as Di Renjie
 Yu Heng as Zhang Wenguan
 Min Min as Dai Zhide
 Chen You-hsin as Pei Yan
 Chen Cheng as Dahulu
 Fang Mian as Wu Shihuo
 Chang Chuan as Yao Lie
  as Madam Zheng / Madam Yang
 Hu Wen-tou as eunuch

1985 Taiwanese television series debuts
1986 Taiwanese television series endings
Taiwanese television series
Television series set in the Tang dynasty
Television series set in the Zhou dynasty (690–705)
1980s Taiwanese television series
Works about Wu Zetian
Television series set in the 7th century
Cultural depictions of Wu Zetian
Cultural depictions of Di Renjie